Enfield West was a constituency which returned one Member of Parliament (MP) to the House of Commons of the Parliament of the United Kingdom.  It was created for the 1950 general election and abolished for the February 1974 general election.

Boundaries
The Urban District of Potters Bar, and the Urban District of Enfield wards of South West and West.

Potters Bar Urban District (comprising that town, South Mimms and North Mimms, namely the western half of the seat) became part of Hertfordshire in 1965 however no change was made then to Westminster representation. The other district's wards having also been Middlesex became parts of Greater London, under the same Act passed in 1963 following a Royal Commission.

Members of Parliament

Elections

Elections in the 1950s

Elections in the 1960s

Elections in the 1970s

References 

Parliamentary constituencies in London (historic)
Constituencies of the Parliament of the United Kingdom established in 1950
Constituencies of the Parliament of the United Kingdom disestablished in 1974
Politics of the London Borough of Enfield